The 1992 European Olympic Basketball Tournament was FIBA Olympic Qualifying Tournament for basketball at the 1992 Summer Olympics in Barcelona, Spain. It was held in five other Spanish cities, Bilbao, Granada, Murcia, Badajoz and Zaragoza, from June 22 till July 5. 25 FIBA Europe teams were divided into four groups. The best four from final round qualified directly for the Olympic Games.

Group A 

All games played at the Pabellón Municipal de Deportes La Casilla, Bilbao.

Group B 

All games played at the Palacio de Deportes de Granada, Granada.

Group C 

All games played at the Pabellón Príncipe de Asturias, Murcia.

Group D 

All games played at the Pabellón de La Granadilla, Badajoz.

Final round 

All games played at the Pabellón Príncipe Felipe, Zaragoza.

References 

1992
Qualifying
Basketball
International basketball competitions hosted by Spain
1991–92 in European basketball
1991–92 in Spanish basketball